Mihai Răzvan Udrea (born 20 July 2001) is a Romanian professional footballer who plays as a goalkeeper for Viitorul Târgu Jiu, on loan from FCSB.

Career statistics

Club

Honours

Club 
FCSB

 Cupa României: 2019–20

References

2001 births
Living people
Romanian footballers
Association football goalkeepers
Liga I players
FC Steaua București players
Liga II players
FC Unirea Constanța players
Liga III players
FC Steaua II București players
Sportspeople from Craiova